Wilhelm Brückner may refer to:

 Wilhelm Brückner: (1884 – 1954) Adolf Hitler's chief adjutant
 Wilhelm Brückner (luthier): (born 1932) German violin maker
 Wilhelm Brückner (murderer): (ca. 1894 – 1925) German mass murderer
 Wilhelm Brückner-Rüggeberg: (1906 – 1985) German conductor